Cherno More is a village in Burgas Municipality in southeastern Bulgaria.

References

Villages in Burgas Province